Skołyszyn  is a village in Jasło County, Subcarpathian Voivodeship, in south-eastern Poland. It is the seat of the gmina (administrative district) called Gmina Skołyszyn.

References

Villages in Jasło County